Nemesis 4: Death Angel (also known as Nemesis 4 and Cry of Angels: Nemesis 4) is a 1996 science fiction film written and directed by Albert Pyun, who also directed the previous installments in the series. It is the sequel to Nemesis 3: Prey Harder, and is the fourth installment in the Nemesis film series.

Plot
Following an uneasy ceasefire between the humans and the cyborgs, Alex Sinclair (Sue Price) is making a living in the future working as a cybernetically-enhanced assassin for her boss Bernardo (Andrew Divoff). But when Alex accidentally targets the wrong man and kills the son of a major crime syndicate head, she finds herself on the run once again as every assassin in town comes to collect the bounty on her. And all the while, Alex has been seeing a woman in black watching her from a distance. Alex begins to think the Angel of Death is waiting to come for her.

Cast
 Blanka Copikova as Woman In Black
 Andrew Divoff as Bernardo
 Michal Gucík as Priest
 Nicholas Guest as Earl Typhoon
 Andrej Lehota as Thug
 Hracko Pavol as Thug
 Simon Poland as Johnny Impact
 Sue Price as Alex Sinclair
 Juro Rasla as Carlos Jr.
 Norbert Weisser as Tokuda

External links
 

1996 films
1996 independent films
1990s science fiction action films
American independent films
American science fiction action films
Danish independent films
Danish science fiction action films
1990s English-language films
Films directed by Albert Pyun
Cyborg films
Nemesis (film series)
1990s American films